Wolfgang Murnberger (born 13 November 1960) is an Austrian film director. He directed more than forty films since 1984.

Selected filmography
I Promise (1994)
Komm, süßer Tod (2000)
Silentium (2004)
The Bone Man (2009)
 (2010, TV film)
My Best Enemy (2011)
 (2013, TV film)
Life Eternal (2015)
 (2015, TV film)
 (2016, TV film)

References

External links 

1960 births
Living people
Austrian film directors
Austrian television directors